Lawrie Madden (born 28 September 1955, in Hackney), is an English former professional footballer, who played in The Football League for nine different clubs between the 1970s and 1990s. He was a member of the Sheffield Wednesday side that won the 1991 League Cup.

His final league side was Chesterfield, who he joined in October 1993 and left towards the end of the 1995–1996 season. His final League match was for Chesterfield at Oxford United, on 12 August 1995.

Honours
 Sheffield Wednesday
 League Cup winner 1991

References

English footballers
Arsenal F.C. players
Mansfield Town F.C. players
Charlton Athletic F.C. players
Millwall F.C. players
Sheffield Wednesday F.C. players
Leicester City F.C. players
Wolverhampton Wanderers F.C. players
Darlington F.C. players
Chesterfield F.C. players
1955 births
Living people
English Football League players
Footballers from the London Borough of Hackney
Association football defenders